The House of Razi-Bondarenko is a building at Petrovsky, 84 in the city of Taganrog of the Rostov region. Nadezhda Razi and Semyon Mikhailovich Bondarenko were its most famous owners at different times.

History 
In the third quarter of the 19th century, Razi, a merchant, acquired the site which would become the corner of Bolshoy Birzhevoy Lane. Close the one-story building which was the property of his wife – Nadezhda Razi, in Kobzareva's girlhood was located. The building belonged to it since 1873. In this place, two buildings appeared over time. In angular, there was a Zvezdochka restaurant which the petty bourgeois Dmitry Antonovich Kremenitsky supported. Nearby the Gepferta hotel in which property there was also the best cooperative confectionery bench in the city worked. Then in the house, the bookstore of the teacher of initial schools S. S. Belokovsky who worked not for long was placed and then carried over A. A. Vashinenko. In the 1880th years, the printing house appeared here. The house belonged to Nadezhda Razi till 1906. It is known that in 1908 her successors and M. A. Popondopulo's successors submitted the application on the device on an even side of the street of the Petrovsky brick extension and bench.

In 1913 (according to other data – in 1915) site with constructions, Semyon Mikhailovich Bondarenko began to own. Before he, according to an old numbering of streets, owned houses across Aleksandrovskaya, 50 and Mikhaylovskoy, 41. Semyon Bondarenko's father was a merchant, and Semyon Mikhailovich began the activity with purchase and resales of large consignments of fishes.

Semyon Bondarenko was known in the city thanks to the cinematography which it opened in Tchaikovsky Lane in January 1914. On a facade, the inscription for which drawing up used electric bulbs was placed. The inscription said "Semyon Bondarenko movie theater". Since April 1916 Bondarenko personally was engaged in the development of theater, watched that pictures were shown "without blinkings". It reached it thanks to the fact that replaced the old equipment – new, a release of the factory the Stalemate.

In March 1918 the movie theater was nationalized and renamed in "Palace". In 1919 in it, the theater of an art miniature "Mosaic" opened. Since 1920 it already began to be called "The second state a name of the Great Russian revolution". Since 1925 began to carry the name "Great Mute". In the 1930th years received the modern name Rot Front. It is known that it became the city's first sound movie theater, and after July 1957 became large-format.

References 

Tourist attractions in Taganrog
Buildings and structures in Taganrog